All the Light We Cannot See is a 2014 war novel that was written by American author Anthony Doerr. The novel is set during World War II and centers around the characters Marie-Laure Leblanc, a blind French girl who takes refuge in her uncle's house in Saint-Malo after Paris is invaded by Nazi Germany; and Werner Pfennig, a bright German boy who is accepted into a military school because of his skills in radio technology before being sent to the military. The novel is written in a poetic style, and almost all of the chapters alternate between Marie-Laure's story and Werner's story, both of which parallel each other. The narrative has a nonlinear structure, flashing between the Battle of Saint-Malo and the events leading up to it. The story has moral themes such as the dangers of possession and the nature of sacrifice, and portrays fascination with science and nature.

Doerr's first inspiration came from a 2004 train ride, during which he watched a man become angry because his telephone call cut out. Doerr felt the man was unappreciative of the "miracle" of being able to communicate across long distances. He decided to set the novel in World War II with a focus on the Battle of Saint-Malo after a book trip to the town in 2005. Scribner published the novel on May 6, 2014, to commercial and critical success. All the Light We Cannot See was on The New York Times Best Seller list for over 200 weeks and ultimately sold over 15 million copies.  Several publications considered it to be among the best books of 2014, and it won the 2015 Pulitzer Prize for Fiction and the 2015 Andrew Carnegie Medal for Excellence in Fiction. A television adaptation produced by Netflix and 21 Laps Entertainment was announced in 2019.

Plot

Marie-Laure Leblanc
Marie-Laure LeBlanc is a girl who lives in Paris with her father Daniel, the master locksmith at the Museum of Natural History. Marie-Laure went blind at the age of six in 1934, and Daniel aids Marie-Laure adapt to her blindness by creating a model of Paris for her to feel and training her to navigate it. Marie-Laure hears stories about a diamond known as the Sea of Flames that is hidden within the museum; the diamond is said to grant immortality at the cost of endless misfortune to those around the owner. The only way to end the curse is to return the stone to the ocean, its rightful owner.

When Germany invades France in 1940, Marie-Laure and Daniel flee to the coastal town of Saint-Malo to take refuge with her great-uncle Etienne, a reclusive and shell-shocked veteran of the Great War who spends his time broadcasting old records of his dead brother across Europe. Unbeknown to Marie-Laure, the museum has entrusted her father with either the Sea of Flames diamond or one of three exact copies that were made to protect the original gem. Months later, while building a model town of Saint-Malo for Marie-Laure, Daniel is arrested and suspected of conspiracy. He is not heard from again, leaving Marie-Laure alone with Etienne and his longtime maid and housekeeper Madame Manec.

Madame Manec participates in the French Resistance along with other local women. These activities have some success but Madame Manec becomes ill and dies. Marie-Laure and Etienne continue their efforts over the next few years, transmitting secret messages alongside piano recordings and important Morse code information. Eventually, while Marie-Laure is going home to deliver a routine Resistance message from the bakery, she is visited by Sergeant Major Reinhold von Rumpel, a Nazi gemologist who is searching for the Sea of Flames and has tracked the real one to Saint-Malo. Von Rumpel asks the frightened Marie-Laure if her father left her anything and leaves when she says "just a dumb model". Etienne takes over Marie-Laure's role of message deliverer, and she later opens the model of Etienne's house on the Saint-Malo model and finds the Sea of Flames. Etienne is eventually arrested on false charges of terrorism and sent to Fort National.

Werner Pfennig
In Germany, Werner Pfennig is an orphan in the coal-mining town of Zollverein. Werner is exceptionally bright and has a natural skill for repairing radios. He discovers this skill in 1934 at the age of eight after he finds a broken radio with his sister Jutta, fixes it, and uses it to hear science and music programs transmitted across Europe. In 1940, Werner's skill earns him a place at the National Political Institute of Education at Schulpforta, a draconian state boarding school teaching Nazi values. Jutta hates Nazi values and has been listening to French radio broadcasts relating horrifying stories about Germany's invasion, and is angered by Werner when he accepts a place at Schulpforta. Before leaving for Schulpforta, Werner promises Jutta he will return to Zollverein in two years to fly away with her on an airplane.

In Schulpforta, Werner begins working on radio technology alongside Frank Volkheimer—a large, gentle student—under the supervision of Schulpforta professor Dr. Hauptmann. Volkheimer eventually leaves to join the military. Werner befriends Frederick, a kind-hearted and inattentive student whose weakness earns him the ire of other students. The other students eventually beat Frederick, who becomes amnesiac, resulting in his being sent back to his home in Berlin. Two years after entering, when Werner asks to leave Schulpforta, Dr. Hauptmann lies about Werner's age and persuades Nazi officials to send him to the military.

Werner is placed in a Wehrmacht squad led by Volkheimer that consists of engineer Walter Bernd and two soldiers named Neumann. The squad travels throughout Europe, tracking illegal enemy signals and executing whoever is producing them. Werner becomes increasingly disillusioned with his position, especially after his group kills an innocent young girl after he incorrectly traces a signal. When the squad reaches Saint-Malo, Etienne's signal is traced and Werner's group is told to track the broadcast. Werner tracks it to Etienne's house but recognizes the source as the one who broadcast the science programs he listened to at the orphanage. He becomes entranced by Marie-Laure when he sees her traveling to the bakery, and does not disclose the location of Etienne's house.

Battle of Saint-Malo and aftermath

When the Allied forces lay siege to Saint-Malo in August 1944, Marie-Laure grabs the Sea of Flames and hides in the cellar. After sleeping and waking up the next day, Marie-Laure leaves the cellar to drink water. When Von Rumpel enters the house for the Sea of Flames, Marie-Laure hides in the attic. Using Etienne's transmitter, she tries to call for help by transmitting herself reading a braille version of Twenty Thousand Leagues Under the Seas alongside pleas for rescue. During this, Von Rumpel unsuccessfully searches the entire house after discovering the Sea of Flames is no longer in the Saint-Malo model.

Meanwhile Werner, Volkheimer, and Bernd become trapped beneath a pile of rubble in a cellar after Allied forces bomb the hotel in which they were staying. Bernd is wounded in the explosion and dies. Werner mends a radio in an attempt to find help and discovers Marie-Laure's broadcasts. Several days later, Volkheimer realizes they could die soon and has Werner blow up the rubble with a grenade. After they escape, Werner goes to Etienne's house to rescue Marie-Laure and finds von Rumpel, who has become delirious after failing to find the Sea of Flames. After a brief standoff, Werner shoots and kills von Rumpel and meets Marie-Laure. As they flee from Saint-Malo, Marie-Laure places the Sea of Flames inside a gated grotto flooded with seawater from the tide, returning it to the ocean. She gives the key to Werner, who sends her away to safety. Werner is captured and sent to an American disarmament center, where he becomes gravely ill. One night, in a fit of delirium, Werner leaves the hospital tent and accidentally steps on a German landmine, which kills him instantly. Etienne is freed from Fort National and reunites with Marie-Laure.

Thirty years later, Volkheimer finds Jutta and gives her Werner's belongings at the time of his death, including the model house that contained the Sea of Flames, and tells her Werner may have been in love. Jutta travels to France with her son Max, where she meets Marie-Laure in Paris; she is now working as a marine biologist at the Museum of Natural History. Marie-Laure opens the model and finds the key to the grotto. The story ends in 2014 with Marie-Laure, now 86 years old, walking with her grandson Michel in the streets of Paris.

Background and writing

According to Anthony Doerr, the first inspiration for All the Light We Cannot See came during a 2004 train ride during which  he saw a man become angry when his telephone call cut out after the train entered a tunnel. Doerr thought the man was forgetting the "miracle" of the ability to talk to someone from across the world using the phone. This led to him conceptualizing a story set in a time when such a thing would be considered a miracle. After the event, he wrote the title for the novel on a notebook. Initially, the only idea he had for the book was a girl reading to a boy over the radio. During a book trip to France in 2005, Doerr visited Saint-Malo and became fascinated by it. In particular, he was interested in its aged appearance in spite of having been destroyed near the end of World War II. Doerr considered this "an early step" of writing the novel.

The novel took ten years to write, much of which was spent researching for it. Doerr researched diaries and letters written and sent during World War II, and visited Germany, Paris, and Saint-Malo for further study, though this research was hindered by his inability to speak French and German, and having to use Google Translate to read them. In spite of this, Doerr's research allowed him to add details related to each of the settings such as Nazi speech transcripts and the names of German radio manufacturers.

Doerr wanted to write a novel that told a story of World War II in a new way. Before then, many of the war stories Doerr had read portrayed the French resistance as charismatic heroes and the German Nazis as evil torturers. He decided to tell a more nuanced story by featuring a sympathetic young boy named Werner who becomes tragically involved in Nazism and by having the French narrative surround a capable disabled person named Marie-Laure. To balance the sympathetic portrayal of a Nazi, however, Doerr wrote Reinhold von Rumpel as the evil Nazi archetype with which readers would be more familiar. Doerr considered writing the novel to be "fun and super frustrating all at once" because he wrote  over 100 short chapters that alternated between points of view, which he likened to the building of a model house. Because of the lyrical style employed in the novel, Doerr intentionally kept the chapters short to make it accessible to readers.

Style and structure
The writing style of All the Light We Cannot See is lyrical and poetic. According to book critic Steve Donoghue, the story is not simplistic and the writing is readily accessible by readers. The novel is mostly told in the present tense, and each chapter is short and direct. Throughout the writing of the novel, Doerr "allows simple details to say much". The descriptions of points of interest, such as battlefields and beaches, are detailed. In particular, the story from Marie-Laure's point of view uses sharp, sensory details of sound, touch, and smell.

Marie-Laure's and Werner's stories are told in alternate chapters. The narrative moves with the brisk pace of a thriller novel; each chapter is a few pages long, and offers a glimpse of each of the characters and their circumstances. The stories of the two characters parallel each other; Marie-Laure's story is about her experiences without sight while Werner's story is about his fascination with sound. Much of the story takes place between 1934 and 1945, with a focus on the Battle of Saint-Malo in August 1944, where Marie-Laure's and Werner's stories converge. Throughout the novel, the narrative switches between events of the Battle of Saint-Malo and events leading up to it. The last part of the novel takes place in the present day.

Themes

Morality and dilemmas

The characters in All the Light We Cannot See are often morally ambiguous rather than simplistic; the details Doerr uses in the novel prevent the reader from viewing Werner as merely an evil Nazi and Marie-Laure as merely a noble hero. Many of the characters, even the heroes, are flawed in some way. Marie-Laure believes she is not as courageous as others see her and that her experience of blindness is normal for her. Werner is tragically portrayed; he struggles to find free-will and redemption as he is forced to enter a Nazi military school to escape an unpalatable fate in mining, and is ultimately forced to join the military. In spite of his sympathetic portrayal, his actions as a Nazi and his increasing tolerance of violence are unexcused, though he ultimately finds redemption when he rescues Marie-Laure.

Much of the novel deals with ethical themes. Germany's attempt to acquire all of Europe leads to its downfall while Von Rumpel tries to acquire the Sea of Flames, highlighting the dangers of possession. Another theme is the nature of sacrifice; Daniel gives the Sea of Flames to Marie-Laure to keep her alive despite the curse leading to his arrest, and Werner is forced to reluctantly risk his life for Germany. The novel also deals with dilemmas such as choice versus fate and atrocity versus honor. According to Los Angeles Times'''s Steph Cha, "The characters are constantly searching—for forbidden radio transmissions, for the Sea of Flames, for each other—locating tiny points in the chaos of the universe ... They look for meaning while facing the vastness and 'the seismic, engulfing indifference of the world', and their fates hinge on their ability to act when everything seems to be determined on scales they can only imagine."

Fascination with science and nature
Doerr wanted to write a novel in which communication over long distances would have been considered a miracle, having been inspired by an event during his train journey. According to Dan Cryer of the San Francisco Chronicle, many of Doerr's works play on his fascination with science and the natural world, of which All the Light We Cannot See is an example. Christine Pivovar of the Kansas City Star stated "Science and the natural world [in All the Light We Cannot See] take on the role of the supernatural in a traditional fairy tale".

Creatures, geology, and technological advances such as radio waves are portrayed as fascinating marvels in the novel. Marie-Laure is fascinated by marine creatures such as the blind snail while Werner has a passion and gift for science and radio technology. The title refers to the infinite electromagnetic spectrum that includes light; according to Steph Cha, the invisibility of most of the electromagnetic spectrum is a common motif throughout the book, and imparts "texture and rhythm as well as a thematic tension, between the insignificant and miraculous natures of mankind and all the immeasurable components that make up our lives". When the story reaches the early 21st century, a character imagines the abundance of electromagnetic waves flowing from cell phones and computers.

Publication and receptionAll the Light We Cannot See was published on May 6, 2014, by Scribner with a print run of 60,000 copies. It was commercially successful and became a breakout hit upon publication. By December 2014, the book had been reprinted 25 times, equaling 920,000 copies. It was on The New York Times Best Seller list for over 200 weeks, entering the list a few weeks after its publication. It sold well throughout the year; sales tripled after the novel lost the National Book Award to Redeployment. In the run-up to Christmas that year, it was out of stock on Amazon and other booksellers. On Nielsen BookScan's rankings of adult fiction novels, All the Light We Cannot See was listed as the 20th-best-selling novel of 2014, selling 247,789 units; the fourth-best-selling novel of 2015 with sales of 1,013,616 units; and the tenth-best-selling novel of 2016 with sales of 366,431 units. The Millions reported sales of All the Light We Cannot See reached two million copies in March 2016. In January 2021, Publishers Weekly reported All the Light We Cannot See had sold 5.5 million copies in North America and 9.3 million copies worldwide. By September 2021, the novel had sold over 15 million copies. Anthony Doerr found the novel's popularity unexpected because it features a sympathetic Nazi and contains intricate passages about technology.

Critics positively received All the Light We Cannot See. In a collection of fifteen reviews by book review aggregator Book Marks, twelve were either positive or rave reviews. The novel won the 2015 Pulitzer Prize for Fiction and the 2015 Andrew Carnegie Medal for Excellence in Fiction. It was also shortlisted for the National Book Award and was the runner-up for the 2015 Dayton Literary Peace Prize for Fiction. It was considered among the best books released in 2014 by Entertainment Weekly, Kirkus Reviews, The New York Times, The Washington Post, and NPR. Josh Cook of the Star Tribune and Yvonne Zipp of the Christian Science Monitor considered All the Light We Cannot See to be Doerr's best book. In a starred review for Booklist, Brad Hopper called it "a novel to live in, learn from, and feel bereft over when the last page is turned". Cha, although having criticized the reliance on melodrama in the beginning, lauded the novel as a "beautiful, expansive tale". JoJo Marshall of Entertainment Weekly said All the Light We Cannot See is a "not-to-be-missed tale [that] is a testament to the buoyancy of our dreams".

Critics praised the novel's writing style. William T. Vollmann writing for The New York Times Book Review found the novel easy to follow despite its flashbacks and considered it "a good read". In a review in The Boston Globe, John Freeman praised Doerr's work, called his language fresh, and noted his use of show, don't tell. Amanda Vaill, in a review in The Washington Post, considered the novel to be emotionally effective and unsentimental. She wrote; "Every piece of backstory reveals information that charges the emerging narrative with significance, until at last the puzzle-box of the plot slides open to reveal the treasure hidden inside". Although applauding Doerr's attention to detail, Carmen Callil writing for The Guardian considered the novel too long and the dialogue too American; though she forgave Doerr for these. Cryer found the prose to be "gorgeous", Doerr's writing to be robust, and the pacing to be "great".

The characterization was also praised; Pittsburgh Post-Gazette Steven Novak found it to be where the merits of the novel are rooted. Sharon Peters of USA Today wrote; "Few authors can so gently—yet resolutely—pull readers into such deep understanding of and connection with their characters". The focus on characters and their choices in a wartime setting was found to be fresh by both Kirkus Reviews and The New York Times Janet Maslin. Evelyn Beck of Library Journal lauded the characters Marie-Laure and Werner, finding them "so interesting and sympathetic" they engage the reader. Vollman and Cha had differing opinions over which of the two main characters have the best characterization; Vollman cited Marie-Laure's "believable" representation of blindness and Cha cited Werner's internal struggle with Nazism. Vollman in particular criticized the use of Nazi stereotypes.

 Television adaptation 

In March 2019, Netflix and 21 Laps Entertainment acquired the rights to develop a limited television adaptation of All the Light We Cannot See'', with Shawn Levy, Dan Levine, and Josh Barry as executive producers. It was announced in September 2021 that Netflix gave the production a series order of four episodes with Steven Knight as writer and Levy as director. The adaptation is set to star Aria Mia Loberti as Marie-Laure, Louis Hofmann as Werner, Mark Ruffalo as Daniel, Hugh Laurie as Etienne, Lars Eidinger as von Rumpel, and Nell Sutton as young Marie-Laure. Netflix has not announced an official release date of the adaptation.

References

External links
 
 

2014 American novels
American novels adapted into television shows
Charles Scribner's Sons books
Novels set in France
Pulitzer Prize for Fiction-winning works
Novels set during World War II
Novels about blindness
Novels about diseases and disorders
Nonlinear narrative novels
Fictional radio stations
Literature about blind people